The UCLA-NUS Executive MBA (EMBA)  is an education management program developed jointly by the University of California, Los Angeles (Anderson) and the  National University of Singapore, School of Business. It allows senior executives from all around the world to participate.

About the schools

UCLA Anderson School of Management
UCLA Anderson School of Management was established in 1935 and provides management education to more than 1,300 students enrolled in full-time, part-time, and executive MBA and doctoral programs.

NUS Business School
By invitation from the Board of Directors of GMAC (the administrative body for GMAT), the School has been representing the Southeast Asian region as a governing school of GMAC since 2000. The School is also a "Non-European" member of the international network for excellence in management development (EFMD).

Curriculum 
The UCLA – NUS Executive MBA general management curriculum consists of 16-course modules and a two-part Management Practicum conducted via 6 two-week sessions spanning a 15-month period. Participants spend two sessions each at UCLA in Los Angeles and NUS in Singapore, and one each in Shanghai and Bangalore. 

Business qualifications